The second election to Dyfed County Council was held in May 1981. It was preceded by the 1977 election and followed by the 1985 election.  There were a number of unopposed returns, particularly in rural parts of the county.

Overview

The Independents remained the largest party but lost ground to Labour.

In Pembrokeshire, Labour gained three seats from the Independents, although one of these - in Pembroke Dock - was from a former Labour councillor who stood as an Independent.

Ward Results (Cardiganshire)

Aberaeron No.1

Aberaeron No. 2

Aberaeron No.3

Aberystwyth No.1

Aberystwyth No.2

Aberystwyth No. 3

Aberystwyth Rural No. 1

Aberystwyth Rural No.2

Aberystwyth Rural No.3

Cardigan

Lampeter

Teifiside No.1

Teifiside No.2

Teifiside No.3

Tregaron

Ward Results (Carmarthenshire)

Ammanford No. 1

Ammanford No.2

Berwick

Burry Port East

Burry Port West

Carmarthen No. 1

Carmarthen No. 2

Carmarthen No. 3

Carmarthen Rural No.1

Carmarthen Rural No.2

Carmarthen Rural No. 3

Carmarthen Rural No. 4

Carmarthen Rural No. 5

Carmarthen Rural No. 6

Carmarthen Rural No. 7

Cwmamman

Felinfoel

Hengoed

Llandeilo No.1

Llandeilo No.2

Llandeilo No.3

Llandeilo No.4

Llandeilo No.5

Llandeilo No.6

Llanedi

Llanelli No.1

Llanelli No.2

Llanelli No. 3

Llanelli No.4

Llanelli No.5

Llanelli No. 6

Llanelli No.7

Llangennech

Llan-non

Newcastle Emlyn No.1

Newcastle Emlyn No.2

Pembrey

Pontyberem

Trimsaran

Westfa

Ward Results (Pembrokeshire)

Cemaes No. 1

Cemaes No. 2

Cemaes No. 3
This ward was previously known as Narberth No.3 but was renamed following the transfer of several wards from South Pembrokeshire to Preseli District Council.

Fishgaurd and Goodwick No. 1

Fishgaurd and Goodwick No. 2

Haverfordwest No.1

Haverfordwest No. 2

Haverfordwest Rural No. 1

Haverfordwest Rural No. 2

Haverfordwest Rural No. 3

Haverfordwest Rural No. 4

Haverfordwest Rural No. 5

Milford Haven No. 1

Milford Haven No. 2

Milford Haven No. 3

Narberth No. 1

Narberth No. 2

Neyland and Llanstadwell

Pembroke No. 1

Pembroke No. 2

Pembroke No. 3
The previous Labour councilor stood as an Independent but was defeated by a future MP.

Pembroke Rural No. 1

Pembroke Rural No. 2

Tenby

References

1981
1981 Welsh local elections